Chapman Hall is an academic building located on the University of Oregon campus. It was designed by Ellis F. Lawrence and was built in the late 1930s. It is made of concrete and brick. Today, it houses the Robert D. Clark Honors College.

Early history 

Construction on Chapman Hall began in December 1938, less than a year later it would be finished in October 1939. The designs for this building were started two years earlier in 1937. The architects for the building were Lawrence, Holford and Allyn. The chief designer was E.F Lawrence. Lawrence was the main designer and architect for the University Oregon from 1914 to 1946. The building was named after Charles H. Chapman, 2nd President of the University of Oregon. The building was financed by both the Student Union and the Works Progress Administration. Chapman Hall is placed on the Memorial Quad of the University of Oregon campus. It is located on the North-East corner right next to 13th street. It was the 6th and last building to be built on that quad. Its sister building is Condon Hall, which is located across the quad from Chapman Hall. Chapman Hall was designed to bring the social sciences into the Memorial Quad. It originally housed the English department on the second floor. Home Economics were on the third and the first UO Bookstore was on the first floor. The campus bookstore was a student cooperative. The place of the bookstore is marked by a paved area and benches on the south side of the building. The bookstore was housed there from 1939 until 1966.

Construction 

The building is rectangular in plan. The main elevation is on the West side of the building. Construction of the building is concrete with a brick façade. There are steel windows. The facing of the building is done in terra cotta and brick. The style of the building is Mediterranean and is in keeping with many of the Lawrence buildings on the University of Oregon campus. The building has undergone some structural changes over time. In 1966, the façade was altered to change the north door into a window. In 1981 partitions were added to the third floor to make room for offices. Chapman Hall was the first fireproof building to be constructed at the University of Oregon.  It would become the standard for the rest of the campus construction. Most of the interior of the building is still intact, including woodwork and a fireplace with ceramic tiles.  In 1942 a mural was added to room 223. It was a Works Progress Administration mural done by E.R Scott as his thesis work. The mural is done in the New Deal Social Realist style. It depicts some famous figures such as Thomas Paine, and Thomas Jefferson. The building has decorative elements of red and white terra cotta tiles, Roman arches, basket weave brick pattern below the windows. Chapman Hall would be the last use of terra cotta at the University of Oregon.

Current use 

Chapman Hall now houses the Clark Honors College. The Honors College moved into the building in the 1980s.

References

University of Oregon buildings
1939 establishments in Oregon